This list includes flags that either have been in use or are currently used in Antarctica.

Antarctic flag proposals

Flags of Antarctic territorial claims

Territorial flag proposals

Flags of international Antarctic organizations

Antarctic expedition flags

Antarctic base flags

Other flags

References

flags
Antarctica
Flags in art